Apeplopoda mecrida is a moth of the family Erebidae. It was described by Herbert Druce in 1889. It found in the US state of Arizona, Mexico, Guatemala and Costa Rica.

References

Moths described in 1889
Euchromiina
Moths of North America